This article details records and statistics of Newport County Football Club.

Honours

League
Football League Third Division South champions 1939.
Conference National play-off winners 2013.
Conference South champions 2010.
Southern League Midland Division champions 1995; runners-up 1999.
Hellenic League champions 1990.
Welsh Football League winners 1928, 1937, 1955, 1975, 1980 (Reserve team).

League Performance
Tier 2: 1939–47 (Second Division, 1 full season)
Tier 3: 1920–21, 1958–62, 1980–87 (Third Division, 12 seasons); 1921–31, 1932–39, 1947–58 (Third Division South, 28 seasons)
Tier 4: 1962–80, 1987–8 (Fourth Division, 19 seasons); 2013– (League Two, 6 seasons)
Tier 5: 2010–13 (Conference, 3 full seasons)

Cups
Welsh Cup winners 1980; runners-up 1963, 1987.
FA Trophy runners-up 2012.
FAW Premier Cup winners 2008; runners-up 2003, 2007.
Southern League Merit Cup joint holders 1995, 1999.
Hellenic League Cup winners 1990.
Gloucestershire Senior Challenge Cup winners 1994.
Herefordshire Senior Cup winners 2000.
Welsh Football League Cup winners 1937, 1953, 1958, 1977, 1978; runners-up 1948, 1956, 1973, 1980 (Reserve team)
Royal Gwent Cup winners 1923, 1925.
Monmouthshire/ Gwent Senior Cup winners 1921, 1922, 1923, 1924, 1926, 1928, 1932, 1936, 1954, 1958, 1959, 1965, 1968, 1969, 1970, 1972, 1973, 1974, 1997, 1998, 1999, 2000, 2001, 2002, 2004, 2005, 2011, 2012

Club records
Highest league finish: Joint 9th in Football League Second Division 1939–40 (abandoned season), 22nd in Football League Second Division 1946–47.
Best FA Cup run: 5th round (last 16)
 1948–49; Defeat after extra time vs. Portsmouth, 12 February 1949 (in front of a then-record attendance of 48,581 at Fratton Park).
 2018–19; Defeat by Manchester City, the eventual FA Cup winners that season, 16 February 2019.
Best League Cup run: 4th round (last 16)
 2020–21; Defeat by penalties after drawing 1–1 in normal time against Newcastle United, 30 September 2020. 
Best EFL Trophy run: Semi-final (last 4)
 1984–85; Defeat by Brentford, 17 May 1985.
 2019–20; Defeat by penalties after drawing 0–0 in normal time against Salford City, 19 February 2020.

Match records
Newport County scores are shown first in every match

Firsts
First Football League match: 0–1 vs. Reading, 28 August 1920 (Football League Third Division).
First FA Cup match: 6–1 vs. Mond Nickel Works, 1st Qualifying round, 27 Sep 1913.
First League Cup match: 2–2 vs. Southampton, 10 October 1960.
First Welsh Cup match: 1–0 vs. Mardy, Extra preliminary round, 1912.
First European match: 4–0 vs. Crusaders 16 September 1980 (European Cup Winners' Cup).

Record results
Record League victory: 10–0 vs. Merthyr Town, 10 April 1930 (Football League Third Division South).
Record FA Cup victory: 7–0 vs. Woking, 24 November 1928 (FA Cup round 1).
Record League Cup victory: 6–0 (8–1 aggregate) vs. Exeter City, 14 September 1982 (League Cup round 1, 2nd leg).
Record European Cup Winners' Cup victory: 6–0 vs. Haugar (Norway), 4 November 1980.
Record League defeat: 0–13 vs. Newcastle United, 5 October 1946 (Football League Second Division).
Record FA Cup defeat: 1–8 vs. Brighton & Hove Albion, 19 September 1955 (FA Cup round 1).
Record League Cup defeat: 0–8 vs. Southampton, 25 August 2021 (League Cup round 2).

Season records
Longest stretch of wins (Football League): 10, 22 February 1980 – 12 April 1980.
Longest stretch of wins (non-league): 14, 16 November 1994 – 21 January 1995.
Longest stretch without loss (Football League): 17, 15 March 2019 – 14 September 2019.
Longest stretch without loss (non-league): 21, 31 October 2009 – 15 March 2010.

Attendance records
Record League Attendance Somerton Park: 24,268 vs. Cardiff City, 16 October 1937 (Football League Third Division South). 
Record Cup Attendance Somerton Park: 24,000 vs. Tottenham Hotspur, 9 January 1960 (FA Cup round 3).
Record League Attendance Newport Stadium: 4,221 vs. Havant & Waterlooville, 15 March 2010 (Conference South).
Record Cup Attendance Newport Stadium: 4,616 vs. Swansea City, 11 November 2006 (FA Cup round 1).
Record League Attendance Rodney Parade: 7,326 vs. Notts County, 6 May 2017 (Football League Two). 
Record Cup Attendance Rodney Parade: 9,836 vs. Tottenham Hotspur, 27 January 2018 (FA Cup round 4).

European matches
Newport County scores are shown first in every match

Player records

Most League appearances
As of 16 January 2011. (League matches only, includes appearances as substitute):

Most League Goals
As of 16 January 2011. (League goals only):

Transfer records

Pre 1989

Paid: £80,000 to Swansea City for Alan Waddle, December 1980. As of September 2017, the Waddle signing means Newport County holds the record for the oldest club record transfer fee among Football League clubs.
Received: £78,000 from Oxford United for John Aldridge, 21 March 1984.

Post 1989
Paid: £20,000+ (undisclosed) to AFC Wimbledon for Christian Jolley, January 2013.
Paid: £30,000+ (undisclosed) to Peterborough United for Joe Day, December 2014.
Received: £100,000+ (undisclosed) from Stevenage for Craig Reid, 31 January 2011.
Received: £100,000+ (undisclosed) from Blackpool for Paul Bignot, 22 July 2011.
Received: £100,000+ (undisclosed) from Wolverhampton Wanderers for Lee Evans, 31 January 2013.
Received: £100,000+ (undisclosed) from Manchester United for Regan Poole, 1 September 2015.
Received: £100,000+ (undisclosed) from Wolverhampton Wanderers for Aaron Collins, 22 January 2016.
Received: £500,000+ (undisclosed) from Peterborough United for Conor Washington, 28 January 2014.

PFA Team of the Year 
See: List of Newport County A.F.C. players

International player honours
See: List of Newport County A.F.C. players

See also
Newport County A.F.C. seasons

References

Sources
Newport County A.F.C.
Statto.com: Newport County
Football Club History Database
Welsh Football Data Archive

Records and Statistics
English football club statistics